Artur Balicki (born 11 October 1999) is a Polish professional footballer who plays as a forward for Podlasie Biała Podlaska.

Club career
On 5 October 2020, he joined Garbarnia Kraków on a season-long loan.

References

External links

1999 births
Sportspeople from Lublin
Living people
Polish footballers
Poland youth international footballers
Association football forwards
Ruch Chorzów players
Wisła Kraków players
MKP Pogoń Siedlce players
Garbarnia Kraków players
Legionovia Legionowo players
Ekstraklasa players
I liga players
II liga players
III liga players
21st-century Polish people